The Comedy Company was an Australian comedy television series first aired from 16 February 1988 until about 11 November 1990 on Network Ten, Sunday night and was created and directed by cast member Ian McFadyen, and co directed and produced by Jo Lane. 

The show largely consisted of sketch comedy in short segments, much in the tradition of earlier sketch comedy shows, The Mavis Bramston Show, The Naked Vicar Show, Australia You're Standing In It, and The D-Generation. The majority of the filming took place in Melbourne. The show and characters had a significant effect on Australian pop culture, and had a cult following particularly on Australian youth. 

The series launched several popular characters most especially Con the Fruiterer and Col'n Carpenter, who even featured in a spin-off series.

The word "bogan" was popularised by The Comedy Company character Kylie Mole, portrayed by Mary-Anne Fahey.

The series won two consecutive Logie Awards (1989–1990) for Most Popular Light Entertainment/Comedy Program, while cast member Mary-Anne Fahey won a Logie Award for Most Popular Light Entertainment/Comedy Personality for her appearance on The Comedy Company in 1989.

This program should not be confused with a short-lived American sketch-comedy/variety series of the same name that ran 10 years earlier.

Synopsis 

In 1987, the Media Arts company was asked by Network Ten Australia to produce a one-hour-a-week comedy program.
The Comedy Company premiered in February 1988 and within a few months, The Comedy Company became the most successful comedy program of the decade being the highest rated weekly television program, particularly of note it ran against the Nine Network popular current events show 60 Minutes. Much of its success was due to it being the only family entertainment on television on a Sunday night. The Comedy Company remained the consistently highest rating weekly television program for two years.

The Comedy Company premiered many famous characters such as Con the Fruiterer, Kylie Mole, Col'n Carpenter, Uncle Arthur and David Rabbitborough, which remain minor Australian icons.

The third and final series was titled The New Comedy Company featuring some of the original cast but mostly new cast. This version (and by extension, the show) was cancelled within a year.

The Comedy Company regular, comedian Kym Gyngell also created a spin-off series called Col'n Carpenter (1990–1991) based on his character of the same name. Kylie Mole was also featured in the second series of the ABC's Kittson Fahey (1993).

Characters
Glenn Robbins often did public appearances as his Comedy Company character Uncle Arthur and on The Panel he often referenced The Comedy Company by periodically slipping in and out of the character, as well as appearing in full costume as Arthur for The Panel Christmas Special in 2005.

TV special
In 2002, an hour of clips from The Comedy Company was edited into a special called The Comedy Company: So Excellent, with the subtitle referencing a famed line by the Kylie Mole character.

Merchandising 
Quite a large amount of merchandise was produced for a comedy show, including "The Comedy Company Holiday Book", "My Diary by Kylie Mole", "Con's Bewdiful Australia", T-shirts, dolls and albums (see below).

Discography

Albums

Singles

DVD 
A DVD box set has been released including four DVDs with select clips from the series, the four DVDs are;
 The Best of the Comedy Company Volume 1
 The Best of the Comedy Company Volume 2
 The Best of Con the Fruiterer
 The Best of Col'n Carpenter

Awards

ARIA Music Awards
The ARIA Music Awards is an annual awards ceremony that recognises excellence, innovation, and achievement across all genres of Australian music. The Comedy Company won one awards from two nominations.

|-
|  1989
| The Comedy Company Album
| rowspan="2"| ARIA Award for Best Comedy Release
| 
|-
|  1990
| Comedy Company Classics
| 
|-

Celebrity guests 
Many well-known national and international stars appeared as guests throughout the series including: Julian Lennon, INXS, Kylie Minogue, Jason Donovan and Sigrid Thornton. Con the Fruiterer, played by Mark Mitchell on one episode even met the then Australian Prime Minister Bob Hawke, on the show.

Cast and characters 
 Mark Mitchell as Con the Fruiterer, Marika, Glenn Gelding
 Mary-Anne Fahey as Kylie Mole, Jophesine, Sharon Maclaren
 Ian McFadyen as David Rabbitborough
 Glenn Robbins as Uncle Arthur/Gary Dare, Darren Maclaren
 Kym Gyngell as Col'n Carpenter
 Russell Gilbert as Russ the Postie
 Tim Smith, various characters

Col'n Carpenter
Col'n Carpenter is a 1990 Australian sitcom spinoff, starring Kym Gyngell, reprising his character from The Comedy Company, it ran for two series, co-starring Stig Wemyss and featured singer Kaarin Fairfax and featured former Prisoner star Monica Maughan in a comedy role as Carpenter's Mum.

See also 
 List of Australian television series

References

External links
 
The Comedy Company at the National Film and Sound Archive

ARIA Award winners
1988 Australian television series debuts
1990 Australian television series endings
Australian television sketch shows
Network 10 original programming
Television shows set in Victoria (Australia)